Asbury Park is a city in Monmouth County, New Jersey, United States.

Asbury Park may also refer to:

 Asbury Park station, a NJ Transit station in Asbury Park
 SS Asbury Park, a 1903 coastal steamship and ferry
 "Asbury Park", a song by King Crimson from the 1975 album USA

See also
 Asbury (disambiguation)